Muayan Halaili (sometimes written as ; born 3 August 1991) is an Israeli professional association football player.

Biography

Playing career 
Halaili made his professional debut, coming on as a substitute for Oded Elkayam, in a 0–1 Toto Cup victory against Ahi Nazareth on 12 November 2008. Halaili rose to the first team at Hapoel Haifa during the 2011/12 season where he made his first appearance in a Liga Al match starting against Hapoel Ironi Kiryat Shmona on 20 August 2011.

International career 
Halaili represented Israel at the 2009 Maccabiah Games, winning a bronze medal.

Statistics 
Statistics accurate as of 13 February 2012

References

Footnotes 

1991 births
Living people
Israeli footballers
Association football midfielders
Hapoel Haifa F.C. players
Ihud Bnei Majd al-Krum F.C. players
Liga Leumit players
Israeli Premier League players
Maccabiah Games medalists in football
Maccabiah Games bronze medalists for Israel
Competitors at the 2009 Maccabiah Games